Joaquín Galera Magdaleno (Baúl, May 25, 1940) is a Spanish former professional road bicycle racer.

Major results

1965
Subida al Naranco
Tour de France:
Winner stage 16
1966
La Reineta
1967
Getxo
1968
Subida Urkiola

References

External links 

Official Tour de France results for Joaquim Galera

Spanish male cyclists
1940 births
Living people
Spanish Tour de France stage winners
Sportspeople from the Province of Granada
Cyclists from Andalusia